Avak is an impact crater centered approximately  southeast of Utqiagvik, Alaska, United States.

In the structure, metamorphic basement rocks and regionally flat lying sedimentary rocks are uplifted and intensely deformed. The Avak structure has no surface expression in the swampy, lake-dotted tundra of the Arctic coastal plain. The structure is covered by a thin veneer of permanently frozen Pliocene and Pleistocene rock. This means that the age of the impact took place anywhere between 3 million and 95 million years ago. Palynological data on its ejecta suggest Middle–Late Turonian age of the impact (about 90 million years ago).

The Avak structure provides the structural trap for the natural gas in the adjacent South Barrow and East Barrow gas fields. These fields have accumulated about 37 bcf of natural gas in Jurassic sandstones.

History
The Avak structure was first recognized from seismic surveys in the National Petroleum Reserve No. 4 (NPR4) by the U.S. Navy during the period from 1943 to 1953. Shatter cones and other evidence of impact origin was found.

In 1995, geologists from the Geological Survey of Canada and U.S. Geological Survey found another group of mineralogic features that indicated that Avak is a meteorite impact structure: the planar deformation features.

References

Impact craters of the United States
Cretaceous impact craters
Landforms of North Slope Borough, Alaska
Impact craters of the Arctic